Raymond Alexander Price,  (born  March 25, 1933) is a Canadian geologist. He has used his research on the structure and tectonics of North America’s lithosphere to produce extensive geological maps. He has also provided guidance for nuclear fuel waste disposal and reports on the human contribution to Global warming.

Price was born in Winnipeg, Manitoba, Canada. He obtained his BSc in Geology from the University of Manitoba in 1955. He completed two more degrees in geology at Princeton University; an A.M. in 1957 and a PhD in 1958.

Career
In 1958, Price began working in the Petroleum Geology Section of the Geological Survey of Canada. For the next ten years he studied the structure and tectonics of the Cordillera of western Canada, mapping its geological features.

In 1968, he left the Geological Survey to work at Queen's University as an associate professor. Between 1972 and 1977, he was the head of the Department of Geological Sciences. From 1978 to 1980, Price was a Killam Research Fellow.

From 1980 to 1985, Price was the president of the International Lithosphere Program.

In 1981, Price returned to the Geological Survey to be director-general. He held that position as well as the assistant deputy minister in the Department of Energy, Mines and Resources in Ottawa for the next 7 years. 
From 1988 to 1998, Price was a professor at Queen’s University. From 1989 to 1990, he was president of the Geological Society of America.

Since 1998, Price has been professor emeritus of Geological Sciences and Geological Engineering at Queen's. He continues to conduct research and to supervise thesis research projects.

Research
Price’s structural geology and tectonic mapping of the southern Canadian Rocky Mountains provided new insights on the evolution of the Cordilleran foreland thrust and fold belt in Canada. He has also researched the role of science in public policy development, nuclear fuel waste disposal, earth system science, and the human dimensions of global change.

Affiliations 
Fellow, Royal Society of Canada, since 1972
Foreign Associate, US National Academy of Sciences, since 1988
Fellow, American Association for the Advancement of Science, since 1997
Fellow, Geological Society of America
Distinguished fellow, Geological Association of Canada, since 1995
Professional engineer, member of Professional Engineers of Ontario
Honorary member, Canadian Society of Petroleum Geologists, since 1996
Honorary foreign fellow by the European Union of Geosciences, since 1989
Member, American Geophysical Union
Member, American Association of Petroleum Geologists

Honours and awards
2010, awarded the Massey Medal by the Royal Canadian Geographical Society
2003, made an Officer of the Order of Canada
1998, invited to be the John P. Buwalda Lecturer by the California Institute of Technology
1997, awarded the Michel T. Halbouty Human Needs Award by the American Association of Petroleum Geologists
1993, invited to be the Muan Distinguished Lecturer by Pennsylvania State University
1990, invited to be the Herzberg Lecturer by Carleton University, Ottawa
1989, presented with a Doctor of Science (honoris causa) by Memorial University of Newfoundland
1989, awarded the Major Edward D'Ewes Fitzgerald Coke Medal by the Geological Society of London, England
1988, awarded the Leopold von Buch Medal by the Deutsche Geologische Gesellschaft, Germany
1988, invited to be the D. F. Hewett Lecturer by Lehigh University, Bethlehem, Pennsylvania
1988, made an Officier de l'Ordre des Palmes Académiques, France
1987, presented with a Doctor of Science (honoris causa) by Carleton University
1985, awarded the Logan Medal by the Geological Association of Canada
1984, awarded the R. J. W. Douglas Medal by the Canadian Society of Petroleum Geologists
1981, judged to have written the Best Technical Paper by the Rocky Mountain Association of Geologists, Denver
1980–1981, recognized as distinguished lecturer by the Canadian Society of Petroleum Geologists
1978–1980, awarded a Killam Senior Research Fellow
1969, recognized as distinguished lecturer by the Canadian Institute of Mining and Metallurgy
1957, awarded a Procter Fellow by Princeton University
1955, awarded the Gold Medal in Sciences by the University of Manitoba

Select publications
Price, R.A., 1956. "The base of the Cambrian system in the southeastern Cordillera of Canada".  Canadian Mining and Metallurgical Bulletin, Vol. 49, pp. 765–771.
Norris, D.K., and Price, R.A. 1956. "Coal Mountain, British Columbia". Geological Survey of Canada Map 4-1956.
Price, R.A., 1959. "Flathead, British Columbia and Alberta". Geological Survey of Canada Map 1-1959.
Price, R.A. and Mountjoy, E.W., 1970. "The geological structure of the Southern Canadian Rockies between Bow and Athabasca Rivers, -- A progress report", in "A structural cross-section of the Southern Canadian Cordillera", J.O. Wheeler, editor, Geological Association of Canada, Special Paper Number 6, pp. 7–25.

External links
Online Resume
Queen’s University Bio
2010 Royal Canadian Geographical Society Massey Medal winner

References

1933 births
Living people
Canadian geologists
Geological Survey of Canada personnel
Fellows of the American Association for the Advancement of Science
Fellows of the Royal Society of Canada
Officers of the Order of Canada
People from Winnipeg
Princeton University alumni
Academic staff of Queen's University at Kingston
University of Manitoba alumni
Logan Medal recipients
Massey Medal recipients
Foreign associates of the National Academy of Sciences
Fellows of the Geological Society of America
Structural geologists
Presidents of the Geological Society of America